Acca cloth was an ornamental silk cloth decorated with gold threads. It was a fabric of the fourteenth century. Acca was named after the city Acre in Palestine. The material was in use for royal applications and church vestments.

See also 

 Brocade
 Zari

References 

Textiles
Silk